James Charles Paul Woodcock  is a British computer scientist.

Woodcock gained his PhD from the University of Liverpool. Until 2001 he was Professor of Software Engineering at the Oxford University Computing Laboratory, where he was also a Fellow of Kellogg College. He then joined the University of Kent and is now based at the University of York, where, since October 2012, he has been head of the Department of Computer Science.

His research interests include: strong software engineering, Grand Challenge in dependable systems evolution, unifying theories of programming, formal specification, refinement, concurrency, state-rich systems, mobile and reconfigurable processes, nanotechnology, Grand Challenge in the railway domain. He has a background in formal methods, especially the Z notation and CSP.

Woodcock worked on applying the Z notation to the IBM CICS project, helping to gain a Queen's Award for Technological Achievement, and Mondex, helping to gain the highest ITSEC classification level.

Prof. Woodcock is editor-in-chief of the Formal Aspects of Computing journal.

Books
 Jim Woodcock and Jim Davies, Using Z: Specification, Refinement, and Proof. Prentice-Hall International Series in Computer Science, 1996. .
 Jim Woodcock and Martin Loomes, Software Engineering Mathematics: Formal Methods Demystified. Kindle Edition, Taylor & Francis, 2007.

References

External links
 Official homepage
 Personal homepage
 Research profile
 
 

1956 births
Living people
Alumni of the University of Liverpool
British computer scientists
Formal methods people
Members of the Department of Computer Science, University of Oxford
Fellows of Kellogg College, Oxford
Academics of the University of Kent
Academics of the University of York
Fellows of the British Computer Society
Fellows of the Royal Academy of Engineering
Computer science writers
British textbook writers
Academic journal editors